FIFA Street 2 is the 2006 sequel to the  EA Sports video game  FIFA Street. A new "trick stick beat" system was  introduced and new authentic tricks were also introduced. The game was released for the GameCube, Nintendo DS, PlayStation 2, PSP, Xbox, and mobile phones. The player on the game cover is Portugal international Cristiano Ronaldo.

The home console editions of the game received average reviews for the improvements on the first FIFA Street. However, the hand-held versions, particularly on the DS, were received poorly for not including those innovations.

Gameplay

The game is a street football game in which the player can take control of 4-a-side versions of national football teams in matches where the object is to win by scoring a set number of goals or points via tricks, or within a time limit. In the career mode "Rule the Streets", one creates a player and competes in tournaments around the world to obtain "Skill Bills" to buy clothing and upgrade his rating. As the player improves, he can captain his own street football team and eventually become an international. The best players have special moves often named after their nickname.

Legends of football such as Zico, Carlos Alberto Torres and Abedi Pele are unlockable during the game.

The game has its own in-game radio station, presented by Zane Lowe formerly of BBC Radio 1 and featuring music by artists such as Roots Manuva, Sway, Pendulum, Editors and The Subways.

Reception

The game received "mixed" reviews on all platforms except the DS version, which received "unfavorable" reviews, according to video game review aggregator Metacritic.

The A.V. Club gave the game a B and stated, "Defending against tricks can be like a clumsy piece of physical comedy. When you aren't paralyzed, you fall flat on your face." However, The Times gave the PS2 and Xbox versions three stars out of five and said that it "falls down in one vital aspect — namely[,] the art of defending."

References

External links

Street 2
2006 video games
Electronic Arts games
Association football video games
Street football video games
GameCube games
Nintendo DS games
PlayStation 2 games
PlayStation Portable games
Video games developed in Canada
Xbox games
Video game sequels
Video games set in Brazil
Video games set in Cameroon
Video games set in England
Video games set in France
Video games set in Germany
Video games set in Italy
Video games set in Mexico
Video games set in the Netherlands
Video games set in Nigeria
Video games set in Spain
Video games set in the United States
EA Sports games
EA Sports Big games
Multiplayer and single-player video games
Java platform games
Exient Entertainment games